Asenovo may refer to several villages in Bulgaria:

 Asenovo, Pleven Province
 Asenovo, Veliko Tarnovo Province
 Asenovo, Yambol Province